Manrique (var. Manríquez) is (1) a name of Visigothic origin, a given name derived from the Gothic name Ermanaric ([H]ermanarico, [H][er]manrique) later translated into Spanish and (2) a surname.

Given name
Manrique Pérez de Lara (died 1164), magnate of the Kingdom of Castile and its regent from 1158 until his death
Manrique Gil (1879–1968), Spanish actor and poet
Manrique Larduet  (born 1996), Cuban artistic gymnast

Surname
Manuel Manrique (es) (1793–1823), military leader for the independence of Venezuela
César Manrique (1919–1992), Spanish artist and architect
Francisco Manrique (1919–1988), Argentine policy maker and politician
Fred Manrique, Venezuelan baseball player
Gómez Manrique (c. 1412 – c. 1490), Spanish poet
Jaime Manrique, Colombian writer
Jorge Manrique (1440–1479), Spanish poet
Laurent Manrique (born 1966), French restaurateur and chef who relocated to U.S.A.
Miguel Manrique, Spanish painter
Sebastien Manrique, Portuguese missionary and traveler to India during 1628 – 1643
Kyle Andrew Manrique (2005-now) 

Spanish masculine given names